Tahar (also Romanized as Ţahar; also known as Talkh) is a village in Deh Tall Rural District, in the Central District of Bastak County, Hormozgan Province, Iran. At the 2006 census, its population was 176, in 32 families.

References 

Populated places in Bastak County